Greater Siangic is a language grouping that includes the Siangic languages, Digaro languages (Idu Mishmi and Taraon) and Pre-Tani, the hypothetical substrate language branch of Tani before it became relexified by Sino-Tibetan. The Greater Siangic grouping was proposed by Roger Blench (2014), based on exclusively shared lexical items that had been noted by Modi (2013).  Blench (2014) argues that Greater Siangic is an independent language family that has undergone areal influences from Sino-Tibetan languages, and is not a branch of the Sino-Tibetan language family itself.

Various lexical items exclusively shared by Milang, Koro, Taraon, and Idu have also been noted by Modi (2013). Modi (2013) suggests that Taraon could be closer to Milang than Idu is.

Languages
Blench (2014) lists the following languages in Greater Siangic.
Greater Siangic
Pre-Tani
Idu-Taraon
Siangic
Koro
Milang

Sound correspondences
Modi (2013: 20-22) notes the following sound correspondences among Milang, Taraon, Idu, and Proto-Tani.

See also
Greater Siangic comparative vocabulary list (Wiktionary)

References

 Blench, Roger (2014). Fallen leaves blow away: a neo-Hammarstromian approach to Sino-Tibetan classification. Presentation given at the University of New England, Armidale, 6 September 2014.
 Post, Mark W. and Roger Blench (2011). "Siangic: A new language phylum in North East India", 6th International Conference of the North East India Linguistics Society, Tezpur University, Assam, India, Jan 31 – Feb 2.

 
Languages of India
Proposed language families